Binnenhof station is the northern terminus of Line A of the Rotterdam Metro and is situated in Rotterdam-Ommoord. Trains departing from here are destined for Schiedam Centrum for most of the day. After 5pm their destination will be Kralingse Zoom and at night Alexander.

This station was opened on 28 May 1983 when the East-West Line or Calandlijn was extended from its previous terminus Capelsebrug. It consists of an island platform between two running tracks and is on a section of line that uses overhead wires to provide traction power.

Rotterdam Metro stations
Railway stations opened in 1983
1983 establishments in the Netherlands
Railway stations in the Netherlands opened in the 20th century